Shrew mouse, shrew-mouse or shrewmouse may refer to:
Shrews, family Soricidae;
Various rodents thought to resemble shrews:
Members of the genus Pseudohydromys, from New Guinea;
Members of the genus Microhydromys, also from New Guinea;
Members of the genus Archboldomys, from the Philippines;
Members of the genus Crunomys, from the Philippines and Sulawesi (also known as "shrew rats");
Gairdner's Shrewmouse, Mus pahari, from southern and southeastern Asia;
The Brazilian Shrew-mouse, Blarinomys breviceps, from South America.

Animal common name disambiguation pages